VWF or vWF may refer to:

 Vibration white finger, a form of Raynaud's disease
 Virtual Wafer Fab, a CAD program (see Silvaco)
 Virtual Wrestling Foundation - see Pro Wrestling (NES video game)
 von Willebrand factor, a blood glycoprotein
 Variable-width font, synonym for proportional font